The 2011 SAFF U-16 Championship was the 1st edition of the SAFF U-16 Championship hosted by Nepal from 1 to 10 August at Dasarath Stadium. Six teams from the region took part, divided into two groups of three teams.

Teams
 
 
 
  (Host)

Group stage

Group A

Group B

Semi-finals

Fifth place playoff

Third place match

Final

Awards

2011 in Asian football
2011
2011
2011 in Nepalese sport
2011 in Bangladeshi football
2011–12 in Indian football
2011–12 in Sri Lankan football
2011 in Bhutanese football
2011–12 in Pakistani football
2011 in youth association football
Sport in Kathmandu